Champagne socialist is a political term commonly used in the United Kingdom. It is a popular epithet that implies a degree of hypocrisy, and it is closely related to the concept of the liberal elite. The phrase is used to describe self-identified anarchists, communists, socialists and liberals whose luxurious upper class or "preppy" lifestyles, metonymically including consumption of champagne, are ostensibly in conflict with their political beliefs.

United Kingdom
The term has  been used by left-wing commentators to criticise centrist views. Some traditional left-wingers regard the first Labour Prime Minister Ramsay MacDonald as a "champagne socialist" who betrayed the Labour movement. MacDonald's lavish lifestyle and his mingling with high society is supposed to have been a corrupting influence that led to the end of the Labour Government in 1931 and the eventual formation of the National Government. More recently, the epithet has been levelled at supporters of the New Labour movement which brought Tony Blair to power in 1997.

In an article about Oscar Wilde's 1891 essay "The Soul of Man under Socialism", political commentator Will Self expressed the view that Wilde could be considered an early champagne socialist because of his aesthetic lifestyle and socialist leanings.

The writer and Labour supporter John Mortimer, when accused of being a champagne socialist, said that he preferred to be thought of as "more a Bollinger Bolshevik".

In the fourth series of the British television comedy Absolutely Fabulous, Saffron is offered a job with New Labour. While she is at pains to avoid being seen as a champagne socialist, her grandmother considers the family to be "Bolly Bolsheviks".

The label has also been applied to the Labour politician Geoffrey Robinson MP on account of his large personal fortune. Singer Charlotte Church has described herself as a "prosecco socialist", referring to the increasing popularity and lower price range of non-champagne sparkling wines such as prosecco and cava.

In the UK, the term is often used by critics to disparage people with a leftwing political view. This argument claims that the champagne socialist espouses leftist views while enjoying a luxurious lifestyle; one example might include Labour Party supporters who stereotypically live in Inner London and consume highbrow media.

This usage of the term has been criticised by Caitlin Moran as a fallacious argument, because she claims it assumes that only those who are poor can express an opinion about social inequality.

Australia and New Zealand
In Australia and New Zealand, the variant "Chardonnay socialist" was used, as Chardonnay was seen as a drink of affluent people. By the late 1990s, chardonnay had become more readily available and generally consumed in Australia; today it is the most dominant white wine variety produced in the country. As a result, the drink's association with elitism has faded.

Staunch Australian right-wingers also used the term to deride those who supported what they considered "middle-class welfare"—government funding for the arts, free tertiary education, and the ABC.

United States
Current Affairs ran a lighthearted article featuring a political cartoon of guests at a Marxist gathering dressed in fancy attire and sipping on champagne. The central argument was that conspicuous consumption was not inherently antithetical to leftist values so long as luxuries were shared equally. As the magazine put it, "When we say let them eat cake, we are serious: there must be cake, it must be good cake, and it must be had by all. The reason Marie Antoinette needed beheading was not that she wished cake on the poor, but that she never actually gave them any."

The term appears in Blind Alleys, a 1906 work of fiction by the American author George Cary Eggleston which distinguishes the "beer socialist" who "wants everybody to come down to his low standards of living" and the "champagne socialist" who "wants everybody to be equal on the higher plane that suits him, utterly ignoring the fact that there is not enough champagne, green turtle and truffles to go round".

A 2021 article in the libertarian magazine Reason written by Jason Brennan and Christopher Freiman derided Bernie Sanders, Elizabeth Warren, and political commentator Hasan Piker as so-called "champagne socialists." In the article, Brennan and Freiman chide these "socialist figureheads" to "open their wallets before they open their mouths" on the basis that each had supposedly donated little of their personal wealth to causes they support, but had instead called for increased taxes. In the case of Sanders and Piker, Brennan and Freiman criticize their supposedly excessive living arrangements, while Warren is reprehended for donating only a small portion of her net worth to causes she advocates for.

Other related terms 
The term is broadly similar to the American terms "limousine liberal", "Learjet liberal", or "Hollywood liberal", and to idioms in other languages such as the Spanish Izquierda caviar, The Portuguese Esquerda Caviar, the French Gauche caviar, the German Salonsozialist, the Italian Radical chic, the Swedish Rödvinsvänster, and Polish kawiorowa lewica. In Turkey, "Cihangir leftist" (Turkish: Cihangir solcusu)  is commonly used, since Cihangir is a high-income neighborhood of Beyoğlu, Istanbul although "champagne socialist" can be used as well. Other related terms include "Hampstead liberal", "Gucci socialist", "Gucci communist", "Neiman Marxist", "cashmere communist", in Ireland, "smoked salmon socialist", and in the Philippines, "steak commandos."

See also 

 Armchair revolutionary
 Baizuo (white left)
 Blanquism
 Class traitor
 Gauche caviar
 Liberal elite
 Limousine liberal
 Regressive left
 Latte#Politics
 Tu quoque

References

External links 

 Dylan Jones: Card-carrying champagne socialists are looking to swap sides - but they want to do it with dignity The Independent
 Champagne socialist at The Free Dictionary

Class-related slurs
Socialism
Social class subcultures
Political metaphors referring to people
Political terminology in Australia
Political terms in the United Kingdom
New Zealand slang
Metaphors referring to food and drink
Stereotypes of the middle class
Stereotypes of the upper class
Left-wing politics in the United Kingdom
Political catchphrases